Mictyris brevidactylus is a species of crab found in Japan, China (including the type location, Hong Kong), Taiwan, Singapore, and parts of Indonesia (Karakelong, Bawean and Ambon Island). The adults have a light-blue carapace and scarlet-jointed legs, while juveniles are yellowish-brown. M. brevidactylus is gregarious and burrows into the sand when disturbed, in a corkscrew motion.

References

External links
 A strain of Mictyris brevidactylus from Iloilo, Philippines From the Int'l Soc. for Taxonomic Explorations by Isidro A. T. Savillo

Ocypodoidea
Crustaceans described in 1858